The Pink'un was a weekly, paid-for newspaper and website that focused on Norwich City football club and also Non-League football in Norfolk, England. The paper was published every Saturday evening in Norwich during the football season. 
Published by Archant, the newspaper was closely linked to its sister publication, the Norwich Evening News.

Although the paper edition is no longer published, the website survives and receives a large amount of traffic. According to a 2007 article in the Eastern Daily Press,
"Take, for example, the PinkUn message board: in September, when City were clearly beginning to show their true colours there were 615,000-page impressions; the following month it had increased to 1,152,000, helped no doubt by the sacking of Peter Grant and the consequent hunt for his replacement.

The day that Glenn Roeder was appointed, 30 October, the PinkUn site received 255,000 page impressions and November, to date, has seen 408,000."

Origin of name
The name of the publication derives from the tradition of many city-based evening newspapers in Britain to produce a special weekly edition with football news, published each weekend. They were printed by their mainstream newspaper on pink paper, hence the name. Some were included with Friday or Saturday editions, and some were sold separately. Some had the formal name of their host newspaper, although they would be known locally as "the Pink 'Un", while others had the formal masthead name of "Pink 'Un". Their production tended to cease from the 1960s onwards as mainstream evening newspapers also declined.

In the Sherlock Holmes story "The Adventure of the Blue Carbuncle", Sir Arthur Conan Doyle's detective successfully obtained some information from a fowl seller by intentionally losing a bet to him. As Holmes explained to a bewildered Dr. Watson, "When you see a man with whiskers of that cut and the Pink 'Un protruding out of his pocket, you can always draw him by a bet."

Somerset Maugham also mentioned the Pink 'Un in his novel Cakes and Ale, Chapter IX, and George Orwell in his novel Burmese Days, chapter 5.

In addition to the Pink 'Un, a lesser number of such papers also produced a "Green 'Un", printed on green paper, which covered horse racing.

References

External links
Pink 'Un Homepage
Norwich Evening News

Newspapers published in Norfolk
Sports newspapers published in the United Kingdom
Saturday newspapers